The following lists events that happened during 1962 in Cape Verde.

Incumbents
Colonial governor: Silvino Silvério Marques

Events
The port of Porto Grande, Mindelo, was expanded

Sports
CS Mindelense won the Cape Verdean Football Championship

Births
Bau, musician
January 27: Neno, footballer
March 15: Jorge Pedro Mauricio dos Santos, politician, current president of the National Assembly
17 May: Antonio Evora Querido, UN FAO Resident Representative in Uganda 
June 4: Ulisses Correia e Silva, politician and Prime Minister

References

 
1962 in the Portuguese Empire
Years of the 20th century in Cape Verde
1960s in Cape Verde
Cape Verde
Cape Verde